Dieter Rams (born 20 May 1932) is a German designer who is most closely associated with the consumer products company Braun, the furniture company Vitsœ, and the functionalist school of industrial design. His unobtrusive approach and belief in "less, but better" design has influenced the practice of design, as well as 20th century aesthetics and culture. He is quoted as stating that: "Indifference towards people and the reality in which they live is actually the one and only cardinal sin in design."

Life and career 
Dieter Rams began his studies in architecture and interior decoration at Wiesbaden School of Art in 1947, now part of the RheinMain University of Applied Sciences. A year later, in 1948, he took a break from studying to gain practical experience and finish his carpentry apprenticeship. He returned to the Wiesbaden School of Art in 1948 and graduated in architecture with honours in 1953, after which he began working for Frankfurt-based architect .

Braun 
Rams joined Braun in 1955, and in 1961, became head of design at the company, a position he retained until 1995.

Rams and his staff designed many memorable products for Braun including the famous SK 4 radiogram and the high-quality 'D'-series (D 45, D 46) of 35mm film slide projectors.  The SK 4, known as the "Snow White's coffin," is considered revolutionary because it transitioned household appliance design away from looking like traditional furniture. By producing electronic gadgets that were remarkable in their austere aesthetic and user friendliness, Rams made Braun a household name in the 1950s.

In 1968, Rams designed the cylindric T 2 cigarette lighter for Braun.  A member of the company's board had asked him for a design; Rams replied "only if we design our own technology to go inside them."  Successive versions of the product went on to use then-current motorcycle-like magnetic ignition, followed by piezoelectric, and finally solar-powered mechanisms.

Vitsœ 

In 1959, Rams began a collaboration with Vitsœ, at the time known as Vitsœ-Zapf, which led to the development of the 606 Universal Shelving System, which is still told today, with only minor changes from the original. He also designed furniture for Vitsœ in the 1960s, including the 620 chair collection. He worked with both Braun and Vitsœ until his retirement in 1997, and continues to work with Vitsœ.

Influence 
His approach to design and his aesthetics influenced Apple designer Jonathan Ive and many Apple products pay tribute to Rams' work for Braun, including Apple's iOS 6 calculator, which references the 1977 ET66 calculator, and prior to a redesign, the appearance of the playing screen in Apple's Podcast app mimicked the appearance of the Braun TG 60 reel-to-reel tape recorder. The iOS 7 world clock app closely mirrors Braun's clock and watch design, while the original iPod closely resembles the Braun T3 transistor radio. In Gary Hustwit's 2009 documentary film Objectified, Rams states that Apple is one of the few companies designing products according to his principles.

The designer Jasper Morrison has spoken of his grandfather's Rams designed Braun "Snow White's Coffin" being an "important influence on [his] choice in becoming a designer."

"Good design" principles 

Rams introduced the idea of sustainable development, and of obsolescence being a crime in design, in the 1970s. Accordingly, he asked himself the question: "Is my design a good design?" The answer he formed became the basis for his celebrated ten principles. According to him, "good design":

 is innovative – The possibilities for progression are not, by any means, exhausted. Technological development is always offering new opportunities for original designs. But imaginative design always develops in tandem with improving technology, and can never be an end in itself.
 makes a product useful – A product is bought to be used. It has to satisfy not only functional, but also psychological and aesthetic criteria. Good design emphasizes the usefulness of a product whilst disregarding anything that could detract from it.
 is aesthetic – The aesthetic quality of a product is integral to its usefulness because products are used every day and have an effect on people and their well-being. Only well-executed objects can be beautiful.
 makes a product understandable – It clarifies the product’s structure. Better still, it can make the product clearly express its function by making use of the user's intuition. At best, it is self-explanatory.
 is unobtrusive – Products fulfilling a purpose are like tools. They are neither decorative objects nor works of art. Their design should therefore be both neutral and restrained, to leave room for the user's self-expression.
 is honest – It does not make a product appear more innovative, powerful or valuable than it really is. It does not attempt to manipulate the consumer with promises that cannot be kept.
 is long-lasting – It avoids being fashionable and therefore never appears antiquated. Unlike fashionable design, it lasts many years – even in today's throwaway society.
 is thorough down to the last detail – Nothing must be arbitrary or left to chance. Care and accuracy in the design process show respect towards the consumer.
 is environmentally friendly – Design makes an important contribution to the preservation of the environment. It conserves resources and minimizes physical and visual pollution throughout the lifecycle of the product.
 is as little design as possible – Less, but better. Simple as possible but not simpler. Good design elevates the essential functions of a product.

Awards and recognition 
Rams has been involved in design for seven decades and has received many honorary appellations throughout his career.

Awards and honours 
 1960: Received Kulturkreis im Bundesverband der Deutschen Industrie
 1961: TP1 portable record player and radio received Supreme Award at Interplas exhibition, London
 1963: F21 received ‘Supreme Award’ at Interplas exhibition, London
 1968: Honorary Member, Royal Designers for Industry of the British Royal Society of Arts
 1969: 620 chair awarded gold medal at the International Furniture Exhibition in Vienna
 1978: Awarded SIAD Medal of the Society of Industrial Artists and Designers, UK
 1985: Awarded Académico de Honor Extranjero by the Academia Mexicana de Diseño, Mexico
 1989: First recipient of the Industrie Forum Design Hannover, Germany, for special contribution to design
 1989: Awarded Doctor honoris causa by Royal College of Art, London, UK
 1992: Received Ikea prize and uses prize money for his own Dieter and Ingeborg Rams Foundation for the promotion of design
 1996: Received World Design Medal from the Industrial Designers Society of America
 2002: Awarded Verdienstkreuz des Verdienstordens der Bundesrepublik Deutschland (Commander's Cross of the Order of Merit of the Federal Republic of Germany)
 2003: Received Design Award ONDI, Havana, Cuba for his special contribution to industrial design and world culture
 2007: Awarded Design Prize of the Federal republic of Germany for his life’s work
 2007: Received  from the Raymond Loewy Foundation
 2009: Awarded the great design prize in Australia.
 2010: Kölner Klopfer prize awarded by the students of the Cologne International School of Design
 2012: Reddot design award and IF product design award, for the BN0106 digital chronograph https://www.phorma.com/NWL/news-53/news-53.htm
 2013: Awarded Lifetime Achievement Medal at London Design Festival 2013

Less and More exhibition 
Less and More is an exhibition of Rams' landmark designs for Braun and Vitsœ. It first traveled to Japan in 2008 and 2009, appearing at the Suntory Museum in Osaka and the Fuchu Art Museum in Tokyo. Between November 2009 and March 2010 it appeared at the Design Museum in London. It appeared at the Museum für Angewandte Kunst in Frankfurt from July to September 2010. The exhibit then appeared at the San Francisco Museum of Modern Art from August 2011 to February 2012.

Rams documentary 
On June 22, 2016 filmmaker Gary Hustwit announced his documentary Rams and launched a Kickstarter campaign for the project. The full-length documentary features in-depth conversations with Rams about his design philosophy, the process behind some of his most iconic designs, his inspiration and his regrets. Some of the funds raised in the Kickstarter campaign also helped to preserve Rams' design archive in cooperation with the Dieter and Ingeborg Rams Foundation.

Dieter Rams. A Style Room 
In 2022, the Museum für Angewandte Kunst in Frankfurt updated and expanded its permanent display titled "Dieter Rams. A Style Room" to mark the designer's 90th birthday. The exhibit also includes photographs by his wife, Ingeborg Rams.

Dieter Rams. Looking back and ahead exhibition
2021 touring exhibit of approximately 30 works, 100 photographs, and information panels. First shown at the Museum Angewandte Kunst, and later on view at the Goethe Institute in New York in 2022.

Gallery of works

Notes

Publications 
 Klemp, Klaus and Ueki-Polet, Keiko (2011). Less and More: The Design Ethos of Dieter Rams. Die Gestalten Verlag. 
 Lovell, Sophie (2011). As Little Design As Possible: The Work of Dieter Rams. London: Phaidon.

References

External links 

 London's Design Museum page on Dieter Rams
 Museum of Modern Art holdings of Rams' work
 Domus Magazine biographical page on Dieter Rams
 Designboom page on Dieter Rams
 Icon magazine interview with Dieter Rams
 A later Icon interview
 Dieter Rams at the Design Museum (Dezeen podcast)
 Vitsœ on Dieter Rams
 Exploring Dieter Rams principle "Good Design is Aesthetic"
 Dieter Rams page on web www.braundesign.es, spanish (english version available)
 Page about Dieter Rams collaboration with Vitsoe on web www.braundesign.es, Spanish (English version available)
 All designs made for Braun by Dieter Rams and his team on web www.braundesign.es, Spanish (English version available)
 10 Principles of good design by Dieter Rams on web www.braundesign.es, Spanish (English version available)
 Rams film by Gary Hustwit on Vimeo (paid streaming)

1932 births
Living people
People from Wiesbaden
People from Hesse-Nassau
Commanders Crosses of the Order of Merit of the Federal Republic of Germany
Members of the Academy of Arts, Berlin
Royal Designers for Industry
German industrial designers
Modernist designers
Product designers
Industrial design
Designers
Compasso d'Oro Award recipients